HD 16760 is a binary star system approximately 227 light-years away in the constellation Perseus. The primary star HD 16760 (HIP 12638) is a G-type main sequence star similar to the Sun. The secondary, HIP 12635 is 1.521 magnitudes fainter and located at a separation of 14.6 arcseconds from the primary, corresponding to a physical separation of at least 660 AU. Announced in July 2009, HD 16760 has been confirmed to have a red dwarf orbiting it, formerly thought to be a brown dwarf or exoplanet.

Stellar companion
The companion object was discovered independently by the SOPHIE extrasolar planets program and the N2K Consortium. It has a mass exceeding the lower limit required for fusion of deuterium in its interior. This criterion is sometimes used to distinguish between brown dwarfs, which lie above the limit, and planets which lie below the limit. However its orbit is nearly circular, indicating that it may have formed in the same way as planets do, from a circumstellar disc. The formation of massive planets up to 20–25 Jupiter masses has been predicted in some models of the core accretion process. The identity of this object as a brown dwarf or a massive planet was thus unclear.

However, data analysed from direct imaging of the companion object using ground-based telescopes fitted with adaptive optics has revealed that it is aligned in a much more face-on orbit than previously realised. Consequently, its mass has been revised upwards. It is now no longer believed to be a large gas giant or even a brown dwarf but with a new mass calculated at around one quarter that of the Sun, or nearly 300 Jupiter masses, it easily qualifies as a stellar object, probably a red dwarf. This was confirmed by Gaia astrometry in 2020.

References

G-type main-sequence stars
016760
012638
BD+37 0604
Perseus (constellation)
Red dwarfs
Binary stars